Nickelodeon: Outta Control was a former attraction in conjunction with Nickelodeon in the Cred Street (now The World of David Walliams) area of Alton Towers theme park in Staffordshire, England. The attraction opened in 1997 consisting of several rooms, each with its own theme. Groups of around 20 would be allowed into the fun house, which featured a variety of interactive options, including slides, rope bridges, and a room filled with sound effect buttons. Upon leaving, guests were played back a recording of their journey around the attraction. The attraction closed in 1998. 

, the attraction still remains empty in The World of David Walliams area of the park and has not been replaced since, even though another ride, Frog Hopper, was placed next to it in 1999. However in 2017, Froghopper was moved in front of the SBNO 4D Cinema. In 2019, it was announced that Cloud Cuckoo Land would be rethemed to The World of David Walliams, meaning there's potential for an attraction to replace it after more than 20 years of not operating.

References

External links
Nickelodeon: Outta Control at Alton Towers Almanac
Nickelodeon: Outta Control at Towers Times 

Closed amusement attractions
Amusement rides introduced in 1997
Amusement rides that closed in 1998
Nickelodeon in amusement parks
Alton Towers